Cuilapa, also known as Santa Rosa Cuilapa, is a town, with a population of 41,359 (2018 census), in Guatemala. It serves as the capital of the department of Santa Rosa and as the administrative seat for the surrounding municipality of Cuilapa.

Cuilapa marks the geographic center of the Americas.

History

1913 earthquake

On Saturday 8 March 1913, an magnitude 6.4 earthquake hit Santa Rosa, destroying its department capital, Cuilapa. Both the initial quake and the aftershocks destroyed a lot of private homes, and also the cathedral and the prison, leaving behind significant human losses; similar destruction occurred at Barberena, Cerro Redondo, Llano Grande and El Zapote. Fraijanes, Pueblo Nuevo Viñas, Coatepeque and Jalpatagua were also affected. Around Cuilapa, there were landslides and road blockades, and even a long crack was reported at Los Esclavos hill.

Climate
Cuilapa has a tropical savanna climate (Köppen: Aw).

Geographic location

Cuilapa is surrounded by Santa Rosa Department municipalities, except by East where it borders Jutiapa:

See also
 
 
 List of places in Guatemala

Notes and references

References

Bibliography

 
 

Municipalities of the Santa Rosa Department, Guatemala